Immaculate Conception Church is a historic church at 708 Erie Street in Grafton, Ohio.

It was built in 1864 and added to the National Register of Historic Places in 1976.

References

Churches in the Roman Catholic Diocese of Cleveland
Churches on the National Register of Historic Places in Ohio
Romanesque Revival church buildings in Ohio
Roman Catholic churches completed in 1864
Churches in Lorain County, Ohio
National Register of Historic Places in Lorain County, Ohio
19th-century Roman Catholic church buildings in the United States